Papa's is the oldest running family group of fish and chip shops. Papas was founded in 1966, by Mr Papas, the family is currently in its third generation and still operate the businesses.

In 2015 the family opened their largest restaurant to date, a 320-seat restaurant and takeaway, which was the world's biggest fish and chip shop, in Willerby in the East Riding of Yorkshire.  In August 2016 they announced expansion into Hull with the conversion of the Swiss Cottage public house into a 250-seat restaurant and takeaway.

Papa's competed against other top fish and chip shops in 2017 to win a BBC contest, The Best of British Takeaways. In this competition they were crowned “Britain’s Best Fish and Chips”.

Cleethorpes Pier was purchased by Papa's for an undisclosed fee in December 2016. The Papas Cleethorpes restaurant and takeaway is currently the world's biggest fish and chip shop with over 500 seats.

Further expansion in Hull took place in December 2020 with the opening of a restaurant in the Kingswood area, that also operates a drive-through service.

The Bilton outlet was refurbished and a drive-through facility was added and opened in January 2021.

It was announced on 6 July 2021 that Papa's are to open their 8th, 9th and 10th Fish and Chip Restaurants in Blackpool, Sheffield and Skegness. At the time of opening the Blackpool location will be the largest Fish and Chip restaurant in Blackpool.

See also
 List of fish and chip restaurants

References

External links
 Papa's Fish and Chips – official web site

Fish and chip restaurants